The Steel Man will be a 32-metre-high sculpture and visitor centre located in Rotherham  (J34,M1), forming a landmark gateway to Yorkshire.  

The project began with a simple idea to create a landmark artwork and visitor centre that would act as a beacon for the Yorkshire region and a catalyst for change: The 32-metre-high stainless steel sculpture will be built in Sheffield, a city steeped in the history of steel production for generations. The Steel Man will honour the people and places that forged this heritage of Steel and it will highlight the new technologies and specialised manufacturing that is helping to generate the northern powerhouse. Schools, universities and other educational facilities have embraced the project which will stand as a totemic symbol of British manufacturing and innovation.

The sculpture and visitor centre project is widely supported by Rotherham Metropolitan Borough Council and a coalition of local companies and other organizations. It will stand on land provided by FCC Environment, (one of the world's largest waste services companies) next to the M1 motorway at Kimberworth in Rotherham, South Yorkshire, England. A 99-year lease has been provided by the landowners and work is expected to begin in 2017. 
 
The figure will be made from stainless steel, recognizing the important development of stainless steel by Harry Brearley in Sheffield more than 100 years ago. It will sit on a coal-black column, which will honor the region's huge coal seams. The column will include an observation deck accessible by a lift and stairs. The sculpture will be widely visible to passing traffic travelling on the M1 across the Tinsley Viaduct and visitors to Meadowhall with a combined potential audience of many millions of people a year. The sculpture will overlook the site of the former Tinsley Towers (Blackburn Meadows) and provide a landmark as well as a catalyst for tourism and inward investment.

Heritage Lottery Fund:
The Steel Man was awarded Heritage Lottery Funding support in April 2016. The award helped fund an important education strategy and scoping research for sustainable income in the future. The award also enabled the design stage for an eco-friendly Interpretation Hub, which will include an exhibition space, café and a shop. 

Heart of Steel Appeal:
The 'Heart of Steel' appeal was launched in July 2014 and has become an important part of The Steel Man: a 2.5 metre 1.5 tonne Heart of Steel will sit inside the figure, with up to 150,000 names of people from across the region engraved on it. Thousands of people with local connections and personal recollections have already donated to support the project. 

The Rotherham Heart of Steel is a full-size replica of the 'Heart of Steel' and was  unveiled in the Minster Gardens in Rotherham town centre on 4 July 2015. 

The Steel Man charity - Yorkshire Icon Ltd (reg no  1159282) - recently announced the British Heart Foundation has now officially adopted the 'Heart of Steel' and the income will support the BHF and their important work in life-saving heart research. 

The Steel Man project still needs further funding and a major new fundraising campaign is underway.

References

External links

Buildings and structures in Rotherham
Outdoor sculptures in England